I Only Want You to Love Me is a 1976 West German television movie written and directed by Rainer Werner Fassbinder, and starring Vitus Zeplichal and Elke Aberle.

Plot 
Peter Trepper (Vitus Zeplichal) is a young man who is serving ten years in prison for committing an impulsive murder.  A psychologist (Erika Runge) interviews him to learn his motive and life history.  Peter has a loveless childhood in the home of his innkeeper parents (Alexander Allerson and Erni Mangold).  Despite his obedience and good works, he fails to win their acceptance.  Hastily, Peter marries his girlfriend Erika (Elke Aberle) and relocates to Munich, where he continues his quixotic efforts to gain approval, especially from his new wife.  He pressures himself to work long hours while spending money lavishly, leading to constant stress over debts.  When Peter loses his job, he finally snaps, striking and strangling a bartender (Janos Gönczöl) who reminds him of his own father.

Cast 
 : Peter
Elke Aberle : Erika
Alexander Allerson : Peter's father
Erni Mangold : Peter's mother
Johanna Hofer : Erika's grandmother
Katharina Buchhammer : Ulla
Wolfgang Hess : Construction foreman
Armin Meier : Construction company manager
Erika Runge : Psychologist
Ulrich Radke : Erika's father
Annemarie Wendl : Erika's mother
Janos Gönczöl : Bartender
Edith Volkmann : Bartender's wife
Robert Naegele : Apartment manager
Axel Ganz : Usher
Inge Schulz : Mrs. Emmerich
Heinz H. Bernstein : Furniture salesman
Helga Bender : Saleswoman
Adi Gruber : Postal clerk
Heide Ackermann : Knitting machine saleswoman
Sonja Neudorres : Jeweler
Reinhard Brex : Businessman
Lilo Pempeit : Elderly woman at post office

Production 
The film was shot in 25 days between November and December 1975 and broadcast by the ARD television network on March 23, 1976.  The movie was commissioned by ARD's affiliate Westdeutsche Rundfunk Köln (WDR) and produced by Bavaria Atelier GmbH, the predecessor of Bavaria Film.  The production of I Only Want You to Love Me cost roughly 800,000 Deutsche Marks.

The screenplay is based on a true story from the book Lebenslänglich - Protokolle aus der Haft (English: Life – Transcripts Behind Bars) by Klaus Antes, Christiane Ehrhardt, and Heinrich Hannover (Munich,  1972).

External links

This article incorporates material from the corresponding article in the German Wikipedia.

1976 films
1976 television films
1976 drama films
German drama films
West German films
German television films
Films directed by Rainer Werner Fassbinder
German-language television shows
1970s German films
Das Erste original programming